May Louise Greville Cooksey (10 January 1878 – 1943) was a British painter of ecclesiastical subjects, figures and landscapes in the Pre-Raphaelite style.

Biography
Cooksey was born in Birmingham and studied at both the Leamington School of Art and at Liverpool School of Art. She then went on to study at the South Kensington School of Art in London where she won silver and bronze medals for her work. A travelling scholarship allowed Cooksey to visit Italy. When she returned to London she took a teaching position at the South Kensington School. She exhibited on a regular basis at the Royal Academy and later in life lived at Freshfield in Lancashire. Cooksey was a member of the Liverpool Academy of Arts.

References

External links

1878 births
1943 deaths
20th-century English painters
20th-century English women artists
Academics of the Royal College of Art
Alumni of Liverpool John Moores University
Alumni of the Royal College of Art
Artists from Birmingham, West Midlands
English women painters